Nina Micić (born 30 January 1991 in Kraljevo) is a Serbian snowboarder. She won a silver medal at the 2007 European Youth Winter Olympic Festival in the parallel giant slalom event. She is the first Serbian athlete who won a medal at the Winter EYOF. Nina qualified for 2014 Winter Olympics and became first Serbian Olympic snowboarder in history.

Career highlights
Nina represents Serbia in the World Championships, World Cup and Winter Universiade.

Personal life
Nina's younger brother Vasilije Micić is a professional basketball player. She has been dating Luka Mitrović who is a professional basketball player also; she gave birth to their first child in February 2022.

References

External links
 Nina Micić at fis-ski.com
 

1991 births
Living people
Serbian female snowboarders
Sportspeople from Kraljevo
Snowboarders at the 2014 Winter Olympics
Olympic snowboarders of Serbia